Jimsar County is a county in Changji Hui Autonomous Prefecture, Xinjiang, China. According to the 2002 census, it has a population of 130,000.

Near the town of Jimsar are the ruins of the ancient city of Beiting or Ting Prefecture, the headquarters of the Beiting Protectorate during the 8th century. It was later known as Beshbalik and became one of the capitals of the Uyghur Khaganate and then the Kingdom of Qocho.

History 
The name Beshbalik first appears in history in the description of the events of 713 in the Turkic Kul Tigin inscription. It was one of the largest of five towns in the Uyghur Khaganate.  The Tibetans briefly held the city in 790. Established in 1902 as a county, it was known as Fuyuan (孚远) until 1952, when its name was changed to Jimsar.

The modern city Jimsar is located at 43°59'N, 89°4'East; It is a location of the Uyghur ancient southern capital Beshbalik or Beshbalyq. "Balıq" means city in Old Turkic language, so the meaning of Beshbalik/Beshbalyq is "Five cities". This city name appeared in Yuan dynasty record as both 五城(Wǔ Chéng, means 5 cities) or 别失八里(bié shī bā lǐ). It became the Uyghur main capital after a disastrous results of the Yenisei Kirghiz attack on the Uyghur northern capital Karabalgasun (Khanbalyk).

After the attack, a significant part of the Uyghur Khaganate population fled to the area of the present Jimsar County and Tarim Basin in general in 840, where they founded the Kingdom of Qocho. The Uyghurs submitted to Genghis Khan in 1207. Beshbalik consisted of five parts: an outer town, the northern gate of the outer town, the extended town of the west, the inner town and a small settlement within the inner town. At first, the city was the political center of the Uyghur Idiquit (monarch) and his Mongol queen, Altalun, daughter of Genghis Khan under the Mongol Empire in the first half of the 13th century. Alans were recruited into the Mongol forces with one unit called "Right Alan Guard" which was combined with "recently surrendered" soldiers, Mongols, and Chinese soldiers stationed in the area of the former Kingdom of Qocho and in Besh Balikh the Mongols established a Chinese military colony led by Chinese general Qi Kongzhi (Ch'i Kung-chih). Due to military struggles between the Chagatai Khanate and the Yuan dynasty during the reign of Kublai Khan, the city was abandoned and lost its prosperity in the late 13th century. The History of Yuan records the name as both Wu-ch'eng 五城 (5 cities) and Bie-shi-ba-li 别失八里.

Jimsar city was established in the south of the ruins of Beshbalik.

Climate

Notes

References 
 Beckwith, Christopher I. (2009). Empires of the Silk Road: A History of Central Eurasia from the Bronze Age to the Present. Princeton University Press. .
 Area map http://www.maplandia.com/china/xinjiang-uygur/jimsar/jimsar/

County-level divisions of Xinjiang
Changji Hui Autonomous Prefecture